Jaggy Shivdasani (born 1958) is one of India's most successful bridge players. Having burst onto the India's national scene in 1976 by winning the premier Holkar Trophy, he went on to win all national titles, usually multiple times. He represented India in numerous international events, including the 1988 World Team Olympiad in Venice, where his team reached the semi-finals before losing to the United States (the eventual winner). Shivdasani is from Mumbai (also known as Bombay).

In July 1987, Shivdasani made history when he became the first foreigner ever to win one of the three major North American team events: the Spingold Knockout Teams.  In autumn 1987 he won his second straight major title, the Reisinger Board-a-Match Teams, as part of a foursome that included players from four countries.

Tournament record

Winner
 North American Bridge Championships (3)
 North American Swiss Teams (1) 2002
 Reisinger Board-a-Match Teams (1) 1987
 Spingold Knockout Teams (1) 1987
 Asia & Middle East Championships (1)
 Open Teams (1) 1997

Runners-up 
 Asia & Middle East Championships (2)
 Open Teams (2) 1985, 1989

References

External links 
 

1958 births
American contract bridge players
Indian contract bridge players
Living people
Date of birth missing (living people)
Place of birth missing (living people)
Sportspeople from Mumbai
Game players from Maharashtra
Bridge players at the 2018 Asian Games
Asian Games bronze medalists for India
Asian Games medalists in bridge
Medalists at the 2018 Asian Games